Clear History is a 2013 American comedy film written by Larry David, Alec Berg, David Mandel and Jeff Schaffer, directed by Greg Mottola and starring Larry David, Kate Hudson, Danny McBride, Philip Baker Hall, Jon Hamm, Michael Keaton, Eva Mendes, Amy Ryan, Bill Hader and J. B. Smoove. The film premiered on August 10, 2013, on HBO.

Plot
In 2003, bearded, long-haired Nathan Flomm (Larry David) is an opinionated, obnoxious business associate of Will Haney (Jon Hamm), whose company in San Jose, California is about to introduce a new electric car. Flomm objects to the car being named "the Howard" after Haney's son, who is himself named after Howard Roark, hero of The Fountainhead. After Flomm accepts a severance package to cut ties with the company, he becomes a ridiculed public figure when the Howard is a huge success, costing Flomm what would have been his share — a billion dollars.

Ten years later, a balding, clean-shaven Flomm has changed his name to Rolly DaVore and moved to Martha's Vineyard, beginning a new life and making new acquaintances. They include new best friend Frank (Danny McBride), now former lover Wendy (Amy Ryan), and local building contractor Mr. McKenzie (Philip Baker Hall).

Frank takes Flomm (a.k.a. Rolly) to a surprise birthday party where he punches Jaspar (J. B. Smoove), the only black person at the party, after a loud welcome by Rolly's friends surprises him. Flomm ruins Jaspar's budding romance with Jennifer (Eva Mendes), a formerly heavy-set woman, when he advises her to date other men before settling. Jaspar concludes Flomm is a racist. When learning that the rock band Chicago is returning to the Vineyard for the first time in 20 years, Flomm hears a rumor that Wendy had sex with multiple members of the band after that concert. He is upset that everyone seems to know about this but him.

Haney, now a wealthy mogul, arrives on the island with wife Rhonda (Kate Hudson) and begins building an ostentatious mansion on the site of "Blue Heron," the former Stumpo family home. Flomm is relieved that Haney doesn't recognize him, but can't bear to remain on the island. However, inspired by the movie The Fountainhead, Flomm becomes determined to gain revenge for his lost billion dollars by blowing up Haney's mansion. Frank introduces him to explosives expert Joe Stumpo (Michael Keaton) and Stumpo's friend Rags (Bill Hader). He then persuades McKenzie, the construction foreman, to let him be part of the crew.

Stumpo needs a detonator. Flomm meets with Tibor, a Chechen criminal, and pays him $1,000. While driving away, Flomm has a fender-bender with Tibor's new car (a Howard). Tibor demands Flomm pay for the damage. Jaspar discovers Flomm's true identity and warns if Jennifer dates another man he will make Flomm's identity known. Jennifer takes up with Tibor. Flomm worms his way into a close friendship with Haney's wife Rhonda, pretending to know about architecture and engineering. Flomm lies to Tibor that Jennifer had performed oral sex on members of the band Chicago.

Flomm concludes from Rhonda's attentions that she is attracted to him, which will now be his revenge, rather than blowing up the Haneys' new house. During a heated argument over who should move their car, Flomm mistakes her passion and kisses her. Rhonda is repulsed, asking: "Are you crazy?"

Flomm proceeds with the plotted destruction of the house, to occur during Chicago's concert performance, when no one will be home. The band tells Flomm that two of them did indeed receive oral sex from Wendy on their previous visit. Jaspar becomes furious at seeing Jennifer with Tibor and informs the local newspaper of Rolly's true identity. Haney turns up at the concert and shocks Flomm by embracing him, saying he's been trying to locate him for years. He wants to pay Flomm the billion dollars, feeling guilty over their falling out. Flomm is elated, but now must stop Stumpo and Rags from destroying the mansion, which, it turns out, is being built for the benefit of sick and underprivileged children. Flomm arrives too late. The house explodes just as a bus filled with children arrives.

The three end up serving three years in prison. Bearded and shaggy-haired again after his release, Flomm returns to Martha's Vineyard, reunites with Frank and runs into Jennifer, who is overweight again. They decide to go on a date. Flomm, after a haircut and shave, is welcomed back by his poker buddies. One refers to Haney and Rhonda having gone back to California. Wendy has inherited millions of dollars from an elderly woman. The friends thank Flomm for destroying the ugly mansion. They say the Chicago concert was great and that everybody had a great time, including the band, as Flomm learns to his horror, Jennifer did perform fellatio on band members this time.

Cast
 Larry David as Nathan Flomm, a disgraced former marketing executive, now living alone under the name Rolly DaVore
 Bill Hader as Rags, Stumpo's friend and henchman
 Philip Baker Hall as McKenzie, a foreman
 Jon Hamm as Will Haney, Flomm's former boss
 Kate Hudson as Rhonda Haney, Will's wife
 Michael Keaton as Joe Stumpo, a quarry operator
 Danny McBride as Frank, Flomm's best friend
 Eva Mendes as Jennifer
 Amy Ryan as Wendy, Flomm's ex-girlfriend
 J. B. Smoove as Jaspar
 Liev Schreiber as Tibor

Members of the rock band Chicago appear as themselves.

Schreiber's appearance remains officially uncredited due to his involvement in Ray Donovan, broadcast by HBO's rival network Showtime.

Production
The film began principal photography in July 2012.  The film was shot on location in the Massachusetts towns of Marblehead, Topsfield, Essex, West Gloucester, North Andover, and Beverly, including the North Shore Music Theatre. Around 300 full-time workers were needed on-set. Filming wrapped in November 2012. The film premiered on August 10, 2013, on HBO.

Release

Critical response
On Rotten Tomatoes, the film has an approval rating of 61% based on 28 reviews, with an average rating of 6.5/10. The website's critical consensus reads, "Its semi-improvised structure finds Larry David squarely in his wheelhouse, but with few laughs and a muddled message, it doesn't live up to his usual standards." Another review aggregation website Metacritic, which assigns a rating to reviews, gave the film a weighted average score of 69 out of 100, based on 17 critics, indicating "generally favorable reviews".

Linda Stasi of the New York Post gave the film three and a half stars out of four, saying "Clear History is so funny it made me want to order up some Palestinian chicken." Brian Lowry of Variety gave the film a negative review, saying "Clear History yields the occasional chuckle, but somewhat curbed enthusiasm." David Hiltbrand of The Philadelphia Inquirer gave the film a negative review, saying "Despite a number of funny lines sprinkled through the script, this History isn't very memorable." Matthew Gilbert of The Boston Globe gave the film a negative review, saying "Even if you do like David’s shtick, as I do, you have no business here. The movie plays out something like an extra-long but subpar episode of "Curb Your Enthusiasm."" Allison Keene of The Hollywood Reporter gave the film a positive review, saying "With its seaside setting and lighthearted fun, Clear History is a kind of pleasant, late-summer gazpacho, enjoyed to the sounds of Chicago and debates about whether there is a racial preference between black and white dwarves. That last part should prove that while Larry David might look and feel a little different in this project, he could never be mistaken, like Flomm is, for anyone else."

Robert Bianco of USA Today gave the film a negative review, saying "If you're a fan of Curb Your Enthusiasm, think of this as an extended version of Curb. If you're not, History will not convert you." Hank Stuever of The Washington Post gave the film a positive review, saying "It has a nice, confident and well-edited breeze to it (including a lot of jokes about the band Chicago), with a fun cast that includes standout riffs from Michael Keaton, Danny McBride and Eva Mendes." Laura Bennett of The New Republic gave the film a negative review, saying "Clear History was improvised from 35 pages of script. "You are such an asshole!", one Vineyard resident tells Flomm, which is the movie's main revelation."

Home media
Clear History was released on DVD and Blu-ray on November 5, 2013, and can currently be watched on HBO Max.

References

External links
 Official website
 

2013 television films
2013 films
2013 comedy films
2010s American films
2010s English-language films
American comedy television films
Films directed by Greg Mottola
Films scored by Ludovic Bource
Films set in 2003
Films set in 2013
Films set in 2016
Films set in Martha's Vineyard
Films shot in Massachusetts
Films with screenplays by Alec Berg
Films with screenplays by David Mandel
Films with screenplays by Jeff Schaffer
Films with screenplays by Larry David
HBO Films films